Malcolm Webster may refer to:
 Malcolm Webster (footballer)
 Malcolm Webster (murderer)